Call the Midwife is a British period drama television series based on the best-selling memoirs of former nurse Jennifer Worth, who died shortly before the first episode was broadcast. It is set in the 1950s and 1960s and for the first three series centred primarily on Jenny Lee (Jessica Raine), based on the real Worth.  In the first episode, set in 1957, she begins a new job as a midwife at a nursing convent in the deprived Poplar district of east London. The programme's ensemble cast has also included Jenny Agutter, Pam Ferris, Judy Parfitt, Laura Main, Miranda Hart, Helen George, Bryony Hannah, Charlotte Ritchie and Emerald Fennell. Vanessa Redgrave delivers framing voiceovers in the role of "mature Jenny", and continues to do so even after the younger version of the character was written out of the series.

The idea of adapting Worth's books for television was initially dismissed by the BBC, but revived after Danny Cohen took over the post of Controller of BBC One. A full series was commissioned in 2011 and writer Heidi Thomas adapted Worth's books for the screen. The first episode was broadcast on 15 January 2012 and the initial series of six episodes drew positive reviews and large viewing figures, said by the BBC to be the highest audiences achieved by a new drama series on BBC One since the corporation's current method of measuring audiences began in 2001. Following the second episode, the BBC announced that a second series, expanded from six to eight episodes, had been commissioned. In September 2012 the programme won the Best New Drama award and Hart was named Best Actress at the TV Choice Awards.

The second series began on 20 January 2013, and during the run BBC Controller for Drama Ben Stephenson announced that he had commissioned a third series to be broadcast in 2014, despite the fact that all the original source material had been exhausted by the end of the second series. The series has also achieved success outside the UK. In the United States, the first series' transmission on PBS in the autumn of 2012 drew an average audience of three million viewers. This figure was 50% higher than the network's overall primetime average audience for the 2011–12 television season.

 In February 2023, the BBC renewed the series through to a fifteenth series, keeping the show on the air until at least 2026.

Series overview

Episodes

Series 1 (2012)

Series 2 (2013)

Series 3 (2014)

Series 4 (2015)

Series 5 (2016)

Series 6 (2017)

Series 7 (2018)

Series 8 (2019)

Series 9 (2020)

Series 10 (2021)

Series 11 (2022)

Series 12 (2023)

References
General

Specific

Call the Midwife
Midwifery in the United Kingdom
Call the Midwife (franchise)